RANBP2-like and GRIP domain-containing protein 5 is a protein that in humans is encoded by the RGPD5 gene.

RAN is a small GTP-binding protein of the RAS superfamily that is associated with the nuclear membrane and is thought to control a variety of cellular functions through its interactions with other proteins. This gene shares a high degree of sequence identity with RANBP2, a large RAN-binding protein localized at the cytoplasmic side of the nuclear pore complex. It is believed that this RANBP2 gene family member arose from a duplication event 3 Mb distal to RANBP2. Alternative splicing has been observed for this locus and two variants are described. Additional splicing is suggested but complete sequence for further transcripts has not been determined.

Interactions 

RGPD5 has been shown to interact with Transportin 1.

References

Further reading